John William Agrue (September 11, 1947 – June 29, 2009) was an American serial killer. Convicted of killing his sister-in-law in Illinois in 1966, he would later be paroled and moved to Colorado, where he committed at least two additional murders in 1982. He never stood trial for these latter crimes, and was identified as the killer posthumously via DNA profiling.

Murder of Susan Marino
On July 21, 1966, Agrue met with his 15-year-old sister-in-law Suzanne "Susan" Marino in downtown Joliet, Illinois and asked her to accompany him to the nearby Hammel Woods forest reserve. When they arrived there, he started making romantic advances towards her, only to be promptly rejected. Angered, Agrue pulled out a small knife and stabbed her approximately a dozen times, killing Marino in the process. Later that day, he returned to his home and admitted the murder to his wife, who initially did not believe his claims. To prove his guilt, he drove her to the crime scene and showcased where he had left Marino's purse and shoes.

After this, Agrue's wife began urging him to surrender himself to the authorities. He instead went to a local church and confessed to the priest, who promptly contacted the authorities. Agrue was taken into custody two days later, and during subsequent interviews, he admitted that he had killed Marino because she opposed his advances towards her. Due to his confession and overwhelming evidence implicating him in the crime, Agrue was swiftly convicted, sentenced to a 20-to-50 years prison term and transferred to the Joliet Correctional Center.

Imprisonment, escape, and recapture
In December 1975, Agrue was transported to the University of Illinois Hospital in Chicago, where he was to undergo surgery to donate his kidney to his sister, Kathleen. For this occasion, about 50 prison employees volunteered to supervise him on their days off, as there were fears that he might use the opportunity to escape. The operation was delayed until May 4, and after its success, he was ordered to remain there until he could fully recuperate.

On May 11, Agrue was reported missing from the hospital by one of the security guards. Earlier that day, he had snuck out of a bathroom window and stolen a car, which he abandoned after reaching state lines. From there, he used two fake IDs, hitchhiked and stole other cars during his travels through the various states, with his supposed destination being California. About a week later, however, he was captured in Central City, Nebraska, after somebody reported that their car had been stolen. Agrue offered no resistance during the arrest, and was later extradited back to Illinois to serve the remainder of his sentence.

Colorado murders and arrest
In January 1982, Agrue was paroled and decided to move in with relatives in Colorado. He initially lived in Boulder before moving to Longmont. In late June 1982, he encountered 20-year-old Susan Becker somewhere in the vicinity of Boulder and proceeded to stab her 13 times in the chest, clavicle and neck. After killing her, he dumped the body in the Boulder Canyon, where it was found by fishermen on July 1. Whilst he was considered a suspect in her death, Agrue was not thoroughly investigated at the time and was eventually written off by investigators.

A week after the discovery of Becker's body, Agrue stabbed to death his neighbor, 94-year-old retired librarian Orma B. Smith, at the latter's apartment in Longmont. He later discarded her body in the nearby Big Elk Creek Meadows, where it was found on the following day. Six days after that, Agrue attempted to abduct a woman at knifepoint on the campus of University of Colorado Boulder, but was apprehended on the spot and lodged in the local prison. At the time, he was publicly identified as a suspect in the murder of Smith, but prosecutors could not bring charges due to a lack of concrete evidence linking him to the crime.

Imprisonment and release
In March 1983, Agrue was convicted of the attempted abduction and given a prison sentence, but was immediately returned to Illinois for parole violation. He remained behind bars until 1989, when he was paroled yet again. This time, he decided to remain in Joliet, where he lived for the remainder of his life. Since his last release from prison, Agrue has not been linked to any violent crimes, although one of his neighbors reported that he had bragged about the murders in private and exhibited other disturbing behavior. Because of this, she sought to have a restraining order issued against him, which was not granted on the grounds that Agrue had not harmed her personally.

Death and identification
On June 29, 2009, Agrue was found at his home in Joliet, from what an autopsy determined to be an accidental overdose of prescription medication. Whilst inspecting his home, relatives found women's purses and jewellery in his home, as well as newspapers clippings about the attempted abduction and the murders of Becker and Smith. After his death, investigators from a cold case unit began testing his DNA to determine whether he was truly responsible for the murder of Smith decades prior. Almost a year later, his DNA was successfully matched to that of the Smith crime scene, with authorities announcing that they had officially solved the case.

At the time, he was still considered a suspect in Becker's murder as well, but due to the lack of usable DNA in that case, they had to resort to other means of investigation to solve it. In May 2013, authorities announced that due to the similarity to Agrue's other known murders and other evidence that placed him near the crime scene, he was considered the sole and most likely suspect in Becker's murder. Because of this, Agrue was posthumously labeled a serial killer, with state police and the FBI announcing that they would be reviewing other cold cases to determine whether he's responsible for any further violent crimes. As of July 2022, no other cases have been linked to Agrue.

See also
 List of serial killers in the United States

References

External links
 Ancestry.com profile

1947 births
2009 deaths
20th-century American criminals
Accidental deaths in Illinois
American escapees
American people convicted of kidnapping
American kidnappers
American male criminals
American murderers of children
American people convicted of murder
American serial killers
Criminals from Texas
Drug-related deaths in Illinois
Escapees from Illinois detention
Fugitives
Male serial killers
People convicted of murder by Illinois
People from El Paso, Texas
Violence against women in the United States